Roman Polom (born 11 January 1992) is a former Czech football player who last played for SK Dynamo České Budějovice in the Czech First League.

He represented the Czech Republic at under-21 level and was in the Czech squad for the 2011 UEFA European Under-19 Football Championship, where he played four of his country's matches.

He made his top league debut in the 2012–13 season for AC Sparta Prague. In May 2014 it was announced that Polom would join Dukla Prague on a year-long loan.

He announced his retirement in September 2020 after a long series of injuries at the age of 28.

References

External links
 
 
 
 

1992 births
Living people
People from Sokolov
Czech footballers
Czech Republic youth international footballers
Czech Republic under-21 international footballers
Czech First League players
Czech National Football League players
AC Sparta Prague players
FK Dukla Prague players
FK Mladá Boleslav players
FC Hradec Králové players
SK Sigma Olomouc players
SK Dynamo České Budějovice players
Association football defenders
Sportspeople from the Karlovy Vary Region